Black List is the second of two L.A. Guns compilation albums featuring their third singer Paul Black. Most of this material is previously unreleased.

Track listing
"Stranded in L.A."
"L.A.P.D."
"Show No Mercy"
"One More Reason to Die"
"Looking Over My Shoulder"
"Love & Hate"
"On And On"
"Wired and Wide Awake"
"One Way Ticket to Love"
"Name Your Poison"
"Liquid Diamonds"
"Love Is a Crime"
"Winter's Fool"
"Everything I Do"
"A Word to the Wise Guy"
"Roll the Dice"
"Black City Breakdown"
"The Devil in You" (performed by Black Cherry)

Personnel
Paul Black - lead vocals
Tracii Guns - guitar
Robert Stoddard - guitar
Mick Cripps - bass guitar
Nickey Alexander - drums

L.A. Guns compilation albums
2005 compilation albums
L.A. Guns live albums
2006 live albums